Puncturella brychia is a species of sea snail, a marine gastropod mollusk in the family Fissurellidae, the keyhole limpets.

Description
Puncturella brychia are sea floor predators found in the North Atlantic, especially near Nova Scotia, that feed on both mobile and sessile prey. They use mucus to glide across the bottom of the ocean as their primary mode of mobility. The species reproduces sexually.

References

Fissurellidae
Gastropods described in 1883